The Port of Aden is a key Yemeni port, situated in Aden on the Gulf of Aden. It is the largest and one of the most important ports in Yemen.

Location 
The Port of Aden is situated approximately 170 km east of the strait of Bab Al Mandeb, which connects the Gulf of Aden to the Red Sea. The port is one of the largest natural harbors in the world. Serving as an important oil storage and refueling station for tankers, the port was the second busiest harbor in the world after New York in the 1950s.

Port facilities 

 Ma'alla Multipurpose and Container Terminal
 Aden Container Terminal

 Oil Harbour
 Fishing Harbour

See also 

 Yemen Gulf of Aden Ports Corporation
 Gulf of Aden
 Hudaydah Port

References

External links 
 Official website 

Government of Yemen
Transport in Yemen
Aden
Gulf of Aden
Ports and harbours of Yemen